The 1826 Pennsylvania gubernatorial election occurred on October 10, 1826. Incumbent governor, John Andrew Shulze, defeated Federalist candidate John Sergeant by a wide margin.

Results

References

1826
Pennsylvania
Gubernatorial
November 1826 events